Mr. Universe is the second studio album by the British hard rock band Gillan, and the first with the classic line-up with Ian Gillan, Colin Towns, John McCoy, Bernie Tormé and Mick Underwood.
Released in October 1979. The album reached No. 11 in the UK Albums Chart, and sold over 2 million copies worldwide.

Track listing
All songs written by Ian Gillan and Colin Towns except where noted.

Side one
 "Second Sight" (Towns) – 2:33 
 "Secret of the Dance" – 2:54
 "She Tears Me Down" (Towns) – 5:07
 "Roller" – 4:43
 "Mr. Universe" – 6:14

Side two
"Vengeance" – 3:34
 "Puget Sound" (Gillan, Towns, John McCoy, Bernie Tormé, Mick Underwood) – 4:23 
 "Dead of Night" – 4:04
 "Message in a Bottle" – 3:09
 "Fighting Man" (Towns) – 7:28*

* Recorded at an earlier session (July/August 1978) with a different line-up and can be found on the original Japanese version of the album Gillan. Musicians for this track were Ian Gillan, Colin Towns, John McCoy, Steve Byrd (guitar) and Liam Genockey (drums).

Alternate (Original) version
An album released on September 20, 1979 in Japan by Toshiba-EMI's (Eastworld) billed as Ian Gillan as opposed to "Gillan" and later in the year in Australia (Interfusion) and New Zealand (Parlophone). This release contained several tracks that were not on the album Gillan that came out in October. The track listing was as follows:

Side 1
 "Vengeance" – 3:34
 "Mr. Universe" – 6:14
 "She Tears Me Down" – 5:08
 "Your Sister's on My List" – 4:09***

Side 2
 "Street Theatre" (Towns) – 2:42*
 "Roller" – 4:37
 "Puget Sound" – 4:26
 "Move with the Times" (Gillan, Towns, McCoy) – 5:00*
 "Sleeping on the Job" – 3:34**

Total running time 39:24

* These appear on the 1993 RPM release Gillan – The Japanese Album, see Gillan
** This version has not yet been released on CD 
***Used as a B-side to the UK "Trouble" single and appears on the first release of Future Shock on CD as a bonus track

1989 re-release bonus tracks
In 1989 the album was re-released on CD by Virgin Records, produced by Ian Gillan and Paul "Chas" Watkins, and mixed by John McCoy and Watkins. It followed the original UK track listing and included six bonus tracks:

 "On the Rocks" (live) – 6:38**
 "Bite the Bullet" (live) – 5:38**
 "Mr. Universe" (live) – 7:20***
 "Vengeance" (live) – 4:42***
 "Smoke on the Water" (live) (Ritchie Blackmore, Gillan, Roger Glover, Jon Lord, Ian Paice) – 10:10***
 "Lucille" (live) (Richard Wayne Penniman, Albert Collins) – 2:32****

Total running time 80:02

** Recorded at the Reading Festival, 29 August 1981

*** Recorded at the Reading Festival, 22 August 1980

**** Recorded at Nottingham Rock City, 4 March 1981, previously unreleased, in 2009 was included on Live: Triple Trouble album

Tracks 11 - 15 appear as live bonus tracks on the 2007 Edsel Demon Music Group re-issue of Double Trouble

2007 re-release bonus track
In 2007, the album was re-released in remastered format with new sleevenotes by Ian Gillan by Demon Music Group and one bonus track:

"Smoke on the Water" (live at Kingsway Recorders) – 8:25

Total running time 52:34

Personnel
Gillan
 Ian Gillan – vocals, harmonica, producer
 Bernie Tormé – guitar
 Colin Towns – keyboards, flute, producer
 John McCoy – bass, producer
 Mick Underwood – drums, percussion

Production
Paul "Chas" Watkins – producer, engineer
George Peckham – mastering

Charts

References 

1979 albums
Gillan (band) albums